Gyokushin-ryū was a koryu jujutsu style known for its extensive arsenal of sutemiwaza (sacrifice throws). It shared many techniques with Daitō-ryū Aiki-jūjutsu. Yoseikan Budō partially descends from this style.

References 

Jujutsu
Japanese martial arts